The humidifier disinfectant case was an outbreak of severe lung disease in South Korea caused by humidifier disinfectant contained in the spray.

The pulmonary toxicity of humidifier disinfectants was discovered due to an outbreak of severe lung disease in South Korea, detected in children in the spring of the years 2006 to 2011, and in adults in the spring of 2011; the mortality rate in children was 58 percent, while among adults, 53 percent died or required lung transplants. Autopsies and epidemiological work, followed up by animal studies, led the South Korean CDC to identify PHMG used in humidifiers as the cause.s

Its cause was due to Polyhexamethylene guanidine(PHMG), Methylchloroisothiazolinone(CMIT), Methylisothiazolinone(MIT) and oligo(2-(2-ethoxy)-ethoxyethyl)guanidinium-chloride(PGH).. Experiment of South Korean government found pulmonary toxicity of PHMG and PGH PHMG and PGH caused pulmonary fibrosis in animal experiment. On November 11, 2011, six humidifier disinfectants which contain PHMG and PGH were recovered.  PHMG and PGH was banned in 2011, and new cases ceased occurring.

However Korea Centers for Disease Control and Prevention did not find a causal relationship that CMIT and MIT in humidifier disinfectants cause pulmonary fibrosis. This result did not mean that CMIT and MIT were safe. At least five victim who died due to severe lung disease only used CMIT or MIT-based humidifier disinfectant. CMIT/MIT containing humidifier disinfectants were exempt in recall. However, other toxicity of CMIT and MIT such as brain toxicity and skin toxicity were founded.

Most victims were killed by Oxy's humidifier disinfectant: Oxy Ssakssak New Humidifier on duty. Oxy was the largest seller of humidifier disinfectants. Oxy's original humidifier disinfectant, Oxy Ssakssak Humidifier on duty had been tested on animals because German professor told that inhalation toxicity test is required to make humidifier disinfectant. Oxy changed disinfectant ingredient to PHMG in 2000 and omitted inhalation toxicity test.  

Producer of PHMG and PGH based humidifier disinfectants were sentenced guilty. However producer of CMIT and MIT based humidifier disinfectants were sentenced not guilty in the first instance. Scientific experiment about pulmonary toxicity of CMIT and MIT were published after the first sentence.

See also 
 Reckitt Benckiser

References

21st-century health disasters